Mark Hunter, known as The Cobrasnake (born July 21, 1985), is an American photographer.

Early life
Hunter grew up in Los Angeles. He was raised by a single mom who worked as a dental hygienist for Bill Dorfman, a dentist popular with celebrities. Through his mother’s job, he was able to meet numerous celebrities as a boy. He attended Santa Monica High School.

Career
Hunter was an assistant to the artist Shepard Fairey for several years. Through his work with Fairey, he would attend parties and events attended by many well known artists and musicians. He would bring his camera along to photograph and would often be asked to take pictures for people who left their cameras at home. He started to post the photos to a website he created in early 2004 called Polaroid Scene.
His website of photos of late-night parties frequented by up-and-coming musicians, "it-kids", and indie celebrities is considered according to Vogue “one of the earliest and most impactful social photography sites of its kind”. It allowed anyone on the internet to have access to the emerging hipster subculture. He changed the name of his website after receiving a cease and desist letter from Polaroid.

In the summer of 2005, Hunter met Cory Kennedy at a Blood Brothers concert at the El Rey Theatre in Los Angeles. He took some photographs of her for his web site and they exchanged phone numbers. In January 2006, Kennedy and her best friend began an internship at his office, to fulfill a requirement from her high school for graduation.

In 2010, Hunter opened Cobra Shop, a vintage store in the Hollywood and Highland Center mall. The shop sold exclusive pieces by some of Hunter’s friends including Steve Aoki Shepard Fairey, Jeremy Scott, and Todd Selby.

In 2011, Hunter released a collection with Boy London. He also released a pair of high heeled shoes with Irregular Choice.

In 2018, Hunter started Cobra Fitness Club, a twice-weekly group hike through Runyon Canyon.

Book
In 2022, Hunter published The Cobrasnake: Y2Ks Archive, a monograph of his work going back to 2004.

References

Further reading

External links
 Official website

American photographers
1985 births
Living people
Place of birth missing (living people)